Mersin İdmanyurdu (also Mersin İdman Yurdu, Mersin İY, or MİY) Sports Club; located in Mersin, east Mediterranean coast of Turkey in 1978–79. Mersin İdmanyurdu had relegated from First League in 1977–78 season. It was the second relegation of the team after 2 seasons appearances in first league (9 in total). Mersin appointed coach Octavian Popescu.  The 1978–79 season was the 7th season of Mersin İdmanyurdu (MİY) football team in Second League, the second level division in Turkey. They finished 6th in the Red Group.

Pre-season
Preparation games:
 13.08.1978 - Konya İdmanyurdu-MİY: 0-3.
 16.08.1978 - MİY-Konya İdmanyurdu: 2-0.
 20.08.1978 - MİY-Zonguldakspor: 2-1.

1978–79 Second League participation
The (1978–79) was 16th season of Second League. The league was played with 32 teams, 16 in Red Group and 16 in White Group. Group winners promoted to First League 1979–80 in each group. Runners-up of two groups played a play-off game and winner promoted to first league as well. Last two teams in each group relegated to Third League 1979–80. Mersin İY became 6th with 9 wins and 28 goals in Red Group.

Results summary
Mersin İdmanyurdu (MİY) 1978–79 Second League Red Group league summary:

Sources: 1978–79 Turkish Second Football League pages.

League table
Mersin İY's league performance in Second League Red Group in 1978–79 season is shown in the following table.

Note: Won, drawn and lost points are 2, 1 and 0. F belongs to MİY and A belongs to corresponding team for both home and away matches.

Results by round
Results of games MİY played in 1978–79 Second League Red Group by rounds:

First half

Mid-season
 28.01.1979 - MİY-Adana Demirspor. Sunday, 15:30. Tevfik Sırrı Gür Stadium, Mersin. Goalkeeper Aydın Tohumcu's jubilee match.

Second half

1978–79 Turkish Cup participation
1978–79 Turkish Cup was played for the 17th season as Türkiye Kupası by 122 teams. First, four elimination rounds were played in one-leg elimination system. Fifth and sixth elimination rounds and finals were played in the two-legs elimination system. Mersin İdmanyurdu participated in 1978–79  Turkish Cup from round 3 and was eliminated at round 4 by Ankaragücü. Ankaragücü was eliminated at round 6. Fenerbahçe won the Cup for the 3rd time and became eligible for 1979–80 European Cup Winners' Cup.

Cup track
The drawings and results Mersin İdmanyurdu (MİY) followed in 1978–79 Turkish Cup are shown in the following table.

Note: In the above table 'Score' shows For and Against goals whether the match played at home or not.

Game details
Mersin İdmanyurdu (MİY) 1978–79 Turkish Cup game reports is shown in the following table.
Kick off times are in EET and EEST.

Source: 1978–79 Turkish Cup pages.

MİY amateur team was also participated and eliminated to Tarsus İdmanyurdu:
 R2 - 10.09.1970 - Tarsus İdmanyurdu (3)-MİY (A): 5-0.

Management

Club management
Atilla Perşembe was club president.

Coaching team

1978–79 Mersin İdmanyurdu head coaches:

Note: Only official games were included.

1978–79 squad
Stats are counted for 1978–79 Second League matches and 1978–79 Turkish Cup (Türkiye Kupası) matches. In the team rosters five substitutes were allowed to appear, two of whom were substitutable. Only the players who appeared in game rosters were included and listed in the order of appearance.

Sources: 1978–79 season squad data from maçkolik com, Milliyet, and Cem Pekin Archives.

See also
 Football in Turkey
 1978–79 Turkish Second Football League
 1978–79 Turkish Cup

Notes and references

1978-79
Turkish football clubs 1978–79 season